Chao Pengfei (born 11 July 1987, in Dalian) is a former Chinese-born Hong Kong professional footballer. He played as a striker.

Club career
Chao Pengfei was born in Dalian in China.

South China
On 25 May 2010, Chao Pengfei scored a hat-trick against Happy Valley in the season closing match. It turned out this was his last outing for South China.

Sun Hei
Chao Pengfei joined Sun Hei in 2010 summer after spending one season in South China.

Chao scored for Sun Hei on his debut against Tai Chung on 7 September 2010. He received his first red card in Sun Hei against Citizen on 17 October 2010, which caused the team to lose 4–5. He scored his second league goals against Hong Kong Football Club on 1 May 2011, which helped the team to win over 3–1.

Biu Chun Rangers
Chao Pengfei moved to Biu Chun Rangers in the summer of 2011.

He made his debut for Biu Chun Rangers against TSW Pegasus as a starting XI on 9 September 2011, but he could not help the team to win the match. He scored his first goal for Biu Chun Rangers in a 4–1 victory against Tai Po on 24 September 2011. He made a total of 7 league appearances and scored 1 goal.

Kitchee
In January 2012, Chao is loaned to Kitchee to strengthen the club's attack as it prepares for the 2012 AFC Cup.

He made his league debut for Kitchee against his old club Biu Chun Rangers as a half-time substitute for Huang Yang on 8 January 2012. He did not score any goal in the match, but he helped the team to win over the opponent 6–2. He made four league appearances for Kitchee. He also made 1 league cup and 3 FA Cup appearances for Kitchee. Although he played eight matches for Kitchee, he did not score any goals.

Chao helped the team to win the First Division League, the League Cup and the FA Cup.

Tuen Mun
Chao joined Tuen Mun in the 2012–13 season. When Chao played for the club, it offered him a monthly salary of HKD$80,800.

International career
Chao Pengfei scored a hat-trick and fellow striker Chan Siu Ki scored 4 goals to help Hong Kong defeat Guam and qualify for the finals of the 2010 East Asian Football Championship.

Chao Pengfei was a member of the squad that won the men's football gold medal in the 2009 East Asian Games.

Chao also played in the 2010 East Asian Football Championship and 2010 Asian Games but he scored no goals.

On 28 September 2010, Chao Pengfei scored a goal for Hong Kong national under-23 football team against Australia national under-20 football team in a friendly. The match ended 2:2.

Honour

Club
Kitchee
 Hong Kong First Division League (1): 2011–12
 Hong Kong FA Cup (1): 2011–12
 Hong Kong League Cup (1): 2011–12

South China
 Hong Kong First Division League (1): 2009–10
 Hong Kong Senior Challenge Shield (1): 2009–10

National
With Hong Kong:
2009 East Asian Games Football Event: Gold

Career statistics

Club
Updated 18 June 2012

International

Hong Kong
Updated 9 July 2011

Hong Kong U-23
Updated 11 November 2010.

References

External links

1987 births
Living people
Chinese footballers
Hong Kong footballers
Hong Kong international footballers
Hong Kong First Division League players
South China AA players
Kitchee SC players
Sun Hei SC players
Tuen Mun SA players
Happy Valley AA players
Citizen AA players
Hong Kong Rangers FC players
Association football forwards
Footballers from Dalian
Expatriate footballers in Hong Kong
Chinese expatriate sportspeople in Hong Kong
Footballers at the 2010 Asian Games
Asian Games competitors for China